Martial Henri Merlin (20 January 1860 – 8 May 1935; also Martial Merlin) was a French colonial administrator of the 19th and 20th centuries. He served as the governor-general of Guadeloupe (1901–1903), French West Africa (1907–1908 and 1919—1923), French Equatorial Africa (1908–1917), French Madagascar (1917–1918), and French Indochina (1923–1925).

References

1860 births
1935 deaths
French colonial governors and administrators
Colonial Governors of French Madagascar
Governors-General of French Indochina
Governors of French West Africa
Governors of French Equatorial Africa
French colonial governors of Guadeloupe